The Chaldean Catholic Territory Dependent (or Patriarchal Dependency) on the Patriarch of Jordan is a missionary pre-diocesan jurisdiction of the Chaldean Catholic Church sui iuris (Eastern Catholic : Chaldean Rite, Syriac language) covering (Trans)Jordan.

See also 
Catholic Church in Jordan
Chaldean Catholic Church

References 

Chaldean Catholic dioceses
Christian organizations established in 2004